The 1954 Troy State Red Wave football team represented Troy State Teachers College (now known as Troy University) as a member of the Alabama Intercollegiate Conference (AIC) during the 1954 college football season. Led by fourth-year head coach Jim Grantham, the Red Wave compiled an overall record of 2–5–1, with a mark of 1–2 in conference play.

Schedule

References

Troy State
Troy Trojans football seasons
Troy State Red Wave football